Dr. George Getzel Cohen was born in 1927. He attended Parktown Boys' High School and the University of the Witwatersrand. After this, he founded Harry's Angels, an innovative flying doctors project which flew specialists from South Africa to Swaziland through the 1970s, bringing free specialist treatment to an impoverished country.

The kingdom of Swaziland had few specialists of its own at that time, relying on general practitioners for all medical work. Cohen, a Johannesburg radiologist, approached Harry Oppenheimer, a mining magnate with progressive views, to provide small airplanes to fly surgeons and other specialists from Johannesburg to Mbabane for weekends where they would donate their time to the local hospital. Before Cohen created the project, patients had to be flown to Johannesburg at considerable cost to receive specialist intervention. The project received considerable acclaim in South Africa and Swaziland.

The all-white South African government attempted to use Cohen to provide a similar scheme to one of its Bantustans — land tracts usually without mineral resources parcelled out to blacks — in an attempt to justify apartheid. The aim of involving Cohen was to validate the Bantustans as separate countries to which South Africa was providing help. But Cohen, strongly committed to a non-racist South Africa, refused. Instead, he drew attention to the poverty and malnourishment in these areas, pointing out basic needs which required attention to  before specialist medical services could be of use.  His refusal drew front-page national news coverage.

Cohen won a seat in the Johannesburg City Council representing the anti-apartheid Progressive Party.

He handed over leadership of Harry's Angels to another doctor in 1978 when he migrated to Sydney, Australia, where he ran a highly successful radiology practice for nearly thirty years.

Cohen attended Parktown Boys' High School and the University of the Witwatersrand. He obtained his post-graduate degrees in London at the Royal College of Physicians and Surgeons. He is married to wife of 60 years, Vivian, and  has three children, and  four grandchildren.

References

Harry's Angels, by Bob Hitchock, 1978. Valliant Press.
 
 
 Cohen, G. (1959). The radiological demonstration of Dracunculus Medinensis. The South African Medical Journal, 26 December 1094.
 
 Cohen, G. (1958). Traumatic haemomediastinum: A case report. South African Medical Journal, 15 March, 298.
 Cohen, G. (1957). The radiological differential diagnosis of unilateral pulmonary veiling. 25 November 1186.
 Cohen, G. (1958).  Deduction of chemical composition of urinary calculi by radiological means.  South African Medical Journal, 8 November 1089.
 

1927 births
South African radiologists
Living people
Progressive Party (South Africa) politicians
Alumni of Parktown Boys' High School
University of the Witwatersrand alumni
Australian radiologists
South African emigrants to Australia
South African expatriates in the United Kingdom